Skjold Church may refer to:

 Skjold Church, Bergen, a church in Bergen municipality, Vestland county, Norway
 Skjold Church, Rogaland, a church in Vindafjord municipality, Rogaland county, Norway